Mullumbimby railway station was a station on the Murwillumbah line opening on 15 May 1894. It closed on 16 May 2004 when the line from Casino was closed.

The station forecourt is served by NSW TrainLink coach services to Casino and Tweed Heads.

Platforms & services
Mullumbimby had one platform, with a passing loop. It was served by trains from Sydney including the North Coast Mail until 1973 when replaced by the Gold Coast Motorail which in February 1990 was replaced by a XPT service.

References

External links
Mullumbimby History of Western Australian Railway & Stations gallery
Mullumbimby station details Transport for New South Wales

Disused regional railway stations in New South Wales
Railway stations in Australia opened in 1894
Railway stations closed in 2004
Murwillumbah railway line